Kunwar Pratap Singh Barhath (25 May 1893 – 7 May 1918), also known as ‘Kunwar Ji’, was an Indian revolutionary & anti-British activist known for his role in the revolutionary plot to assassinate the Viceroy of India, Charles Hardinge in 1912. He was a prominent member of the Revolutionary Party led by Ras Bihari Bose. In December 1912, at the procession of the Viceroy in Delhi, Pratap Singh was with his uncle, Zorawar Singh Barhath, who threw the bomb at Lord Hardinge. He led the Benaras Conspiracy, part of the larger Ghadar Movement, to lead the Armed Rebellion of 1915 against the British Raj. In 1916, he was arrested and imprisoned in the Banaras Conspiracy Case and sentenced to 5 years in jail. Subjected to brutal physical torture to weaken him, he refused to divulge the names of other co-conspirators and continued to suffer and died as a martyr on 7 May 1918.

Kunwar Pratap Singh was part of the celebrated Barhath Family of Shahpura (Bhilwara) whose members were prominent revolutionary leaders in the freedom struggle against the British Raj. Thakur Krishna Singh Barhath, his sons Thakur Kesari Singh Barhath and Thakur Zorawar Singh Barhath and grandson Kunwar Pratap Singh Barhath (son of Thakur Kesari Singh) took an active part in the freedom struggle and devoted their lives and belongings for the cause of Indian Independence.

Early life 
Kunwar Pratap Singh was born on 25 May 1893 (VS 1950 Jeshtha Shukla Navami) in Udaipur at Kaviraja Shyamaldas Haveli. He was born in the famed Barhath family of Shahpura in the Sauda lineage of Charans. The Barhath family were affluent aristocrats in Rajputana and jagirdars of Devpura (Shahpura State). At the time, Pratap's father, Thakur Kesari Singh Barhath was serving as Chief Counsellor to the Maharana of Mewar. He was later invited by the Maharaja of Kota in his court where he served as a member of the Council of Kota ruler. Hence, Pratap's childhood was spent in Kota. Thakur Kesari Singh Barhath is known as a great Indian revolutionary, who was a high priority of British CID (Crime Investigation Department) to be monitored at all times. His grandfather Thakur Krishna Singh Barhath was a bureaucrat in the princely states of Udaipur & Shahpura, and a great scholar and patriot. He was highly regarded in the royal courts of Rajputana and Central India. Many kings had honored him by granting jagirs. Thakur Kesari Singh encouraged Pratap Singh to 'sacrifice everything he had for the freedom of motherland'.

Pratap Singh completed his education at Herbert High School Kota and later at DAV High School, Ajmer. He had passed Matriculate.

In his father Thakur Kesari Singh's view, English-medium colleges like Mayo College Ajmer, where the feudal and ruling class of Rajputana sent their children to study, were creating inferiority complex among the students. He wished to promote Nationalist Education in which the students learn about their history, culture of their nation. Pratap Singh was described as having a 'revolutionary bent of mind'. Therefore, he was sent at a young age to Arjunlal Sethi who ran 'Vardhman Pathshala' in Jaipur which secretly gave training in revolutionary activities and later Pratap Singh was introduced to Rash Bihari Bose. Thereafter, when this school was shifted to Indore, Thakur Kesari Singh thought it best send Pratap Singh to Delhi. Although Thakur Kesari Singh was in a high position in the native states, he was also secretly connected to the Revolutionary party. Thus, he sent his younger brother Thakur Zoravar Singh Barahth, his son Pratap Singh Barahth and son-in-law Ishwar Dan Ashiya to Master Amirchand, another nationalist, in Delhi.

Training 
Source:

In Delhi, Master Amirchand had trained Pratap for revolutionary activities including changing disguise, collecting secret news from government offices, establishing contacts with soldiers and youth, etc.

Master Amirchand was greatly impressed by Pratap Singh Barhath. This was the reason that he recommended to Rash Behari Bose to give the responsibility of revolutionary party in Rajasthan to Pratap Singh Barhath. When Master Amirchand introduced Bose to Pratap Singh, Ras Bihari Bose was pleased and said:"Thakur Kesari Singh Barhath is the only person in India who took a holy resolution to sacrifice himself, brother, son and Jamata(son-in-law) to cut off the chains of the motherland".

Revolutionary Party 
Source:

Master Amir Chand introduced Pratap Singh to Rash Bihari Bose as a highly trustworthy, capable, and brave person for the revolutionary cause. Bose inducted him to the Revolutionary Party and he became a prominent member & right-hand man of Bose. He took a leading part in revolutionary projects in Delhi, United Provinces, and Rajasthan. In Rajasthan, he took steps to inspire the soldiers in Ajmer and other British Army cantonments to lead them to rise up and revolt against the British.

Pratap Singh was only twenty years old at that time. At such a young age, he became a universal leader of revolutionaries. Travelling around, he started preparing the soldiers and youth of Rajputana for the freedom struggle. Under his leadership, the revolutionary organization in Rajputana was consolidated & became powerful.

Delhi-Lahore Conspiracy / Hardinge Bomb Case(1912) 

On 23 December 1912, Zorawar Singh and Pratap Singh went to the roof of the building of Marwari College in Chandni Chowk, Delhi. They wore a disguise and went on the roof, where Zorawar Singh threw a bomb directed at Lord Hardinge. Lord Harding was gravely injured but survived the attack while one of his guards died at the impact. After the bombing, both Zorawar Singh and his nephew Pratap Singh absconded from the place and remained hidden. The police made frantic efforts to catch the revolutionaries and even announced a reward of Rs. 1 Lakh for any clue.

Pratap Singh and his brother-in-law, Ishwar Dan Ashiya were arrested by the police but were subsequently released due to lack of evidence.

The authorities arrested other revolutionaries associated with Revolutionary Party named Bhai Balmukund Das and Basant Kumar Biswas who were later executed. Zorawar Singh remained uncaught and spent his life as an outlaw in the ravines of Madhya Pradesh & Rajasthan.

Escape from Delhi 
Pratap Singh and Zoravar Singh had to escape Delhi and they came to the banks of Yamuna. They couldn't cross at the time since there was flooding in the river. For seven hours, Pratap Singh sometimes swam, sometimes dived and sometimes hanged by the chains of the bridge. When it got dark enough, they swam across the river. Pratap Singh was very tired, when he reached the shore, and fell unconscious. Two police constables who saw him crossing became suspicious of him. Zoravar Singh slashed both of them with his sword and carried Pratap Singh on his back.

When Zorawar Singh & Pratap Singh left from Delhi after throwing the bomb, they walked about forty miles in a day. A spy followed them from there. After a few days, when they were leaving the border of Banswara, the spy alerted the Nakadar and told him to catch them. Zoravar Singh immediately razed that Nakadar with his sword and both of them fled from there.

Preparation for Armed Rebellion-Ghadar(1915) 
Source:

Pratap Singh secretly started working for the rebellion among the Rajput soldiers. He moved from place to place, sometimes in Rajputana, sometimes in Punjab and sometimes in Hyderabad(South India), he would go south and carry forward the work of revolution. Pratap Singh and his brother-in-law Ishwar Dan Asiya were arrested by the police in the Delhi conspiracy, but were left due to lack of evidence. On the other hand, his father Thakur Kesari Singh Barhath was tried in the Kota Murder Case and he was sentenced to life imprisonment in 1914. Meanwhile, his uncle Zoravar Singh was sentenced to death in the Arrah conspiracy, but he had escaped. The properties worth crores of Kesari Singh Barath and Joravar Singh was confiscated.

After the bombings in Delhi, Rash Bihari Bose had moved to Kashi and from there to Navadvipa. Hiding from there, they were trying to successfully implement the plan of rebellion. Pratap Singh, despite strict presence of military & police, secretly reached Navadvipa to consult & formulate plans to carry forward the work of armed rebellion. First World War had begun, the revolutionaries in India gave shape to the plan of armed revolution in India after multiple secret consultations. It was decided that on 21 February 1915, an armed rebellion would be signalled from Benaras. During this time, the members of the team would contact the military cantonments and collect a large amount of guns and other armaments. Taking advice from Bose, Pratap moved from Navadweep (Bengal) to Rajasthan and started working according to the plan.

Conspiracy to assassinate Reginald Kradok 
In 1914, after the arrests of prominent leaders like Thakur Kesari Singh Barhath (his father) & Rao Gopal Singh of Kharwa, the leadership fell onto Pratap Singh. Pratap Singh in collaboration with dissident soldiers of the British Indian Army, conspired to murder Sir Reginald Kradok, Home Member of the British Government of India. His murder was supposed to be a signal to Meerut and other garrisons of the Indian Army, part of a grand Armed Rebellion against the British. Pratap Singh Barhath was entrusted with the assassination of Sir Reginald. Incidentally, Reginald Kradok didn't turn up on the day of the assassination, thus foiling the plan and saving his life.

It so happened that the revolutionaries of the Ghadar Party of Punjab received information that the British Government had come to know about their plan for Armed Rebellion, so they decided to change the date but this information could not reach Mr. Sanyal in time. As per the predetermined schedule, on 21 February 1915, Mr. Sanyal along with his associates reached the Parade Ground in Benaras, but the prepared police force present there surrounded them and started arresting them. A total of 25 arrests were made including Mr. Sanyal. Meanwhile, Rash Behari Bose feld to Japan. Sanyal was sentenced to life imprisonment in Kala Pani. 16 revolutionaries including Ranveer Singh and Gurcharan Kar were tried under the Defense of India Act. This trial came to be known as Benaras Conspiracy Case.

Escape to Sindh 
Source:

Soon, as the Benaras Conspiracy Case progressed, arrest warrants against Pratap Singh were issued. The police was after him, but he evaded them and continued to work secretly for the revolution. When his father Kesari Singh Barhath was imprisoned for life, Pratap Singh sent a message to him in jail & assured him that he should not worry, Pratap Singh is still alive. Pratap Singh was engaged in consolidating the revolutionary organization by travelling around in Rajasthan, remaining undetected by the police.

Pratap Singh escaped to Hyderabad (Sindh) where Pratap Singh disguised himself and worked as a compounder in a dispensary. In Sindh, he continued to instill in the youth the spirit of revolution and patriotism. On one hand, the police was looking for him, while on the other hand, his fellow revolutionaries also started searching for Pratap amongst his acquaintances and relatives. Eventually the revolutionaries were successful and Pratap's associates came to know that he was in Hyderabad (Sindh). But in order to mislead the police, they spread rumors of his presence in Hyderabad (South India). Hence, when police interrogated an Oswal family in Jaipur on the whereabouts of Pratap Singh, the family, due to harassment gave an address of Hyderabad, but of the Hyderabad in Deccan, leading police on a blind hunt to South India.

Whereas police went looking for him in Hyderabad (South), the Jaipur associates sent Pratap's accomplice Ram Narayan Choudhary in Hyderabad (Sindh) to warn Pratap. They wanted Pratap to reach Bikaner and take leadership and organise the revolutionaries there. When Ram Narayan Choudhary arrived in Hyderabad, he heard of a young man preaching nationalism & patriotism to the youth & inciting them for revolution. Afterwards, it didn't take long for Chaudhary to find Pratap. Upon meeting Chaudhary & understanding his associates' intentions, Pratap Singh decided to shift his location back to Rajasthan.

Betrayal & Arrest 
He travelled back to Rajasthan and on his way back, decided to stop at Ashanada Station(Jodhpur) and contact the station master, who was also a part of the group. But the station master had been caught by the police a few days back and had turned approver to save himself. This led to the arrest of Pratap Singh Barhath. He was tried for his connection in Benaras Conspiracy Case and sentenced to 5 years jail.

Trial in Benaras Consipiracy Case 
Kunwar Pratap was tried for his complicity in Benaras Conspiracy Case. On 14 February 1916, he was sentenced to 5 years of rigorous imprisonment.

After the Delhi Conspiracy case, the sensational trial of Banaras Conspiracy Case started under a three-judge tribunal against persons related to the conspirators. In this tribunal, S. R. Daniel, B. K. Dalal, and Sheetal Prasad Vajpayee were the judges. The Tribunal, while pronouncing its judgment on 7 March 1916, awarded the following punishments to the accused:

 Pratap Singh Barhath: sentenced to Five years Rigorous Imprisonment.
 Sachindranath Sanyal: life imprisonment and confiscation of property.
 Rao Gopal Singh Kharwa: case withdrawn
 Anand: sentenced to three years rigorous imprisonment
 Kalipad Mukherjee: sentenced to three years rigorous imprisonment
 Ganeshi Lal Khasta: imprisoned for seven years
 Girjababu alias Nagendranath Dutta: sentenced to five years rigorous imprisonment, Rs. 500 fine.
 Jadunath Singh: acquitted.
 Jitendranath Sanyal: sentenced to two years rigorous imprisonment.
 Damodar Swaroop alias Master ji: sentenced to seven years imprisonment.
 Dharam Singh: acquitted.
 Nalini Mohan Mookerjee: sentenced to five years rigorous imprisonment.
 Bankim Chandra Mitra: sentenced to three years rigorous imprisonment.
 Rabindranath Sanyal: acquitted.
 Laxmi Narayan: sentenced to five years strict imprisonment.
 Surendranath Mookerjee: acquitted.

According to the judgment, "Pratap’s services were utilised by the conspirators to get into touch with the disaffected people in Central India and Pratap supported the conspirators."

Bareilly Central Jail-Imprisonment & Death 
Source:

Pratap Singh was held in Bareilly Central Jail where he was subjected to brutal torture to divulge the names & whereabouts of other revolutionary activists. The British authorities applied various tactics including physical and mental torture to weaken him.

The Intelligence Department of the Government of India was very pleased at the imprisonment of Pratap Singh. They knew that Pratap Singh was the exclusive confidant of Rash Bihari Bose and Shachindra Sanyal, other leaders of the Revolutionary Party. They wanted to know who are the members in the revolutionary party, where they lived, and who threw the bomb on Lord Hardinge and what is the future plans of the revolutionary party. Pratap knew everything. He was only 22 years old at that time. The intelligence department believed that it would not be difficult to extract all the secrets from him.

The Director of the Crime Investigation Department, Sir Charles Cleveland came to Bareilly to meet Pratap. He wanted to get the information and whereabouts of his revolutionary colleagues. He tempted Pratap by offering a high position in the government, condoning the twenty years' rigorous imprisonment of his father Thakur Kesari Singh (then at Hazari Bagh jail in Bihar)(imprisoned in 1914), withdrawing the warrant against his uncle Zorawar Singh and returning all the forfeited ancestral properties of the family. Pratap did not budge an inch and refused to betray the revolutionaries. Then they told him that his mother was weeping day and night for him. She would die in agony. Pratap replied:”I have given enough thought to your offer. I am unable to accept it. The reason is that at present it is only my mother who suffers, but if I were to betray the secrets to you, many more mothers would have to suffer. I cannot be the cause of the agony of so many mothers, for the sake of wiping out the tears of my mother alone!”This enraged the authorities. As a result, more torture came and Pratap Singh died on 7 May 1918 in the prime of his youth(he was 22 then).

Quotes

Rash Bihari Bose 
Rash Bihari Bose, famed Indian nationalist leader writes about Pratap in 'How I went to Japan' :–“At the time when we were in Navadweep (Bengal), many brothers used to come and go, among them I will talk about Pratap Singh. Pratap's father, uncle, grandfather have all sacrificed themselves for the country. I had a long association with Pratap. Taking the recommendation of Pandit Arjunlal Sethi, Pratap and his brother-in-law came to Master Amirchand ji (who was hanged in the bombing) in 1913 to serve the country along with the other two boys. On seeing me, Amirchand had said – Babuji! I bring you four big patriots here.

I had sent Awadh Bihari out for some work, when I saw Pratap there, I saw fire in his eyes. Pratap Singh was a lion by nature. When Pratap came to know about the reason for my going abroad to Japan, he cried. He was very sad that he would not be able to see me for a long time. That was my last meeting with Pratap. Pratap is no more in this world.

जेल में ही वह पृथ्वी छोड़ कर स्वर्ग चला गया, जहां की चीज थी, वहीं चली गई। "

Sir Charles Cleaveland 
Sir Charles Cleaveland (Director of the CID Department), who led the interrogation of Pratap Singh in Barelly Jail writes about Pratap in his memoirs :–“I have not seen in my entire life a better man and hero like Pratap. We gave him all kinds of unbearable tortures. Bu,t my salutation to this young man. He did not budge an inch. Extraordinary patriot who stood firm in spite of the inhuman tortures. All our attempts failed. We were defeated. Finally, it was he who won.”

RC Majumdar 
R. C. Majumdar, eminent Indian historian in History of the Freedom Movement in India(1975):–"By the year 1911 a number of young men joined the revolutionary organization and some of them were sent to Delhi for training under Amir Chand, Avadh Bihari, and Bal Mukund. The most famous among these young workers was Pratap Singh son of Barhat Keshari Singh, who played an important part in the various conspiracies organized by Rash Behari Bose. He died a martyr’s death and showed unflinching courage and exemplary endurance."

Shachindra Nath Sanyal 
Shachindra Nath Sanyal, fellow Indian revolutionary writes in his memoir 'Bandi-Jeevan':–“There was a day, when this Rajputana was called the Leela-Niketan of heroes, where Bhishma-like great men had also appeared in this land. It appears to be an utopia, but that glorious Rajputana of the mythological era is not there today. However, even after Rajputana has completely degenerated today, the rites of that past era are still inscribed in the heart of every man in Rajputana. Recalling the story of Pratap & his family, this thing automatically comes to my mind.”

“I have rarely seen a youth like Pratap, near their valor, even the cruelty of God is bound to give up. Whether Pratap himself used to live in bliss or not, those who lived in his company always found happiness.”

Rao Gopal Singh Kharwa 
Rao Gopal Singh Kharwa, ruler of Kharwa estate & a nationalist:–“The God had to sacrifice a hundred Ranghad (brave Kshatriyas) to create one Pratap.”

Mohan Lal Sukhadia 
Mohan Lal Sukhadia, former Chief Minister of Rajasthan(1954–1971):–"The land of Shahpura is a pilgrimage site for us. Hutatma Kesari Singh Ji, the emissary of the revolution, had made his home on Bedi, a holy land made since the birth of the freedom fighter. Everyone should take inspiration from the lives of Thakur Kesari Singh ji and Pratap Singh ji."

Haridev Joshi 
Haridev Joshi, former Chief Minister of Rajasthan on 25 April 1976:–"Sri Kesari Singh, Sri Pratap Singh and Sri  Zorawar Singh were members of the same family. They sacrificed their lives, because they believed it is better to die with self-respect than to be a slave. They led the struggle for freedom with their life. Kesari Singh sacrificed his family for the freedom of India. He stood firm throughout his life, did not break, did not fall."

Ram Narain Chaudhary 
Ram Narayan Chaudhary, Indian independence activist:–“Of all the rebel patriots I came across, Pratap had the greatest impression on me. He was of a very gentle heart and was always happy. According to the Gita, he was a true karma yogi, he had won over the desire of wealth & women.”

Ashok Gehlot 
Ashok Gehlot, 14th Chief Minister of Rajasthan:–"Rajasthan, the land of bravery and valor, was also second to none in the freedom struggle of the country. I pay homage to Shri Kesari Singh Barhath, Shri Zorawar Singh Barhath and Kunwar Pratap Singh Barhath. I am sure that his immortal story will become a powerful medium in the resurgence of the society."

Vasundhara Raje 
Vasundhara Raje, 13th Chief Minister of Rajasthan:–

"Revolutionary leaders Shri Kesari Singh Barhath and his brother Zorawar Singh Barhath and son Pratap Singh Barhath have made valuable contributions to the freedom movement. The entire family of Shri Barhath has sacrificed everything in the freedom movement. They are all our sources of inspiration."

Legacy 
Pratap Singh Barhath along with other members of the Barhath family of Shahpura is taught as part of the secondary syllabus in the RBSC board in Rajasthan.

In 1976, Brij Mohan Sapoot wrote a poetic work titled "Balidani Barhat" as tribute to the Barhath Family of Shahpura.

Kesari Singh Barhath Panorama 
In November 2022, Rajasthan Chief Minister Ashok Gehlot has approved a proposal of Rs 4 crore for the construction of a panorama of freedom fighter Kesari Singh Barath at Shahpura in Bhilwara, which will include a main panorama building, boundary wall, path-way, auditorium, library, audio-video system, various art works, entrance, statue and inscription. The panorama will provide information about the works and personalities of the brave revolutionary members of the Barhath family and educate the younger generation about their rights.

Shaheed Mela 
Since last 50 years, from 1974 onwards, every year on 23 December, Shaeed Mela is celebrated in memory of the Barhath family. It was on this day that Zorawar Singh hurled a bomb on the British Viecroy of India in 1912. A fair is organized in their hometown at Shahpura and the event takes place at Shahid Trimurti Memorial which displays the statues of Thakur Kesari Singh, Thakur Zorawar Singh, and Kunwar Pratap Singh. The event is presided by the political class including MPs, MLAs, and local politicians.

Shri Pratap Singh Barhath Government College 
Shri Pratap Singh Barhath Government College, Shahpura is a government college in Shahpura, Rajasthan.

Portraits in Delhi Assembly 
In January 2019, portraits of revolutionaries of the Barhath Family including Thakur Kesari Singh Barhath, Zorawar Singh Barhath, and Kunwar Pratap Singh Barhath were placed in the gallery of the Delhi Assembly(Vidhan Sabha).

Barhath Haveli of Shahpura 
'Haveli of Late Shri Kesari Singh Barhath' located in Shahpura (Bhilwara) is a State Protected Monument under the Government of Rajasthan.

At the 100th death anniversary of Pratap Singh Barhath, the Barhath Haveli of Shahpura has been converted to Shri Kesari Singh Barhath Government Museum. The haveli of the Barhath family has now become a national museum, in which their personal weapons and armaments are displayed.It was inaugurated by Onkar Singh Lakahwat and Kailash Meghwal.

Pratap Singh Memorial, Asanada 
Pratap Singh Memorial was constructed at Asanada Railway Station in Jodhpur. Pratap Singh was betrayed by the station master and was aressted at this location by British Raj police.

Bibliography

External links 

 Amrit Mahotsav - Digital District Repository - Kunwar Pratap Singh
 Charans.org (चारण समागम) - शहीद प्रताप सिंह बारहट

See also
 Thakur Kesari Singh Barahath
 Ras Bihari Bose
 Shahpura, Bhilwara

References

Indian revolutionaries
Rajasthani people
People from Bhilwara district
Indian independence activists from Rajasthan
Charan
1893 births
1917 deaths
Indian Hindus
Indian nationalists
Barhath family of Shahpura
Revolutionary movement for Indian independence
20th-century executions by British India
People from Rajasthan